Kim Hak-sun ( born on 24 December 1970) is a South Korean actor. He made his acting debut in 2000 in theaters, since then, he has appeared in number of plays, films and television series. He got recognition for his supporting roles in Fight for My Way (2017), Black Dog: Being A Teacher (2019), Do You Like Brahms? (2020), Voice (2021) and Crazy Love (2022). He has acted in films such as: Vanishing Time: A Boy Who Returned (2016), Winter's Night (2018), Juror 8 (2019) among others.

Career
Kim Hak-sun is affiliated to artist management company Star Weave Entertainment since February 2022, which has acquired Entertainment O, to which he was originally affiliated.

After his compulsory military service, Kim Hak-sun joined a pungmul troupe as a manager. Later he attended the Performing Arts Academy and began to perform as an actor with Yeonwoo Theater. He debuted in 2002 in films with a role in Hong Sang-soo’s On the Occasion of Remembering the Turning Gate, and appeared in The Magicians (2005). He got recognition by playing roles in A Million (2009), Juror 8  (2019), Moonlit Winter (2019) and #ALIVE (2020). He has also appeared in TV series such as Signal (2016), Fight for My Way (2017), Something in the Rain (2018) and in the second season of Stranger (2020). He also did some roles alongside his actress wife Kim Jung-young in Merry Christmas Mr. Mo and Oh! My Gran, and as a couple in TV series Heard It Through the Grapevine (2015).

Filmography

Films

Television series

Theater

References

External links
 
 
 Kim Hak-sun on Play DB
 Kim Hak-sun on KMDb
 Kim Hak-sun on Daum 
 

21st-century South Korean male actors
South Korean male television actors
South Korean male film actors 
Living people
1970 births
South Korean stage actors